The ģīga or divstīdzis is a two-stringed bowed zither found in Latvia.

The instrument is descended from the psalmodicon ( or manihorka), a bowed monochord developed in Sweden in 1829 for liturgical singing. From there it filtered down to the Latvian peasantry who sometimes added a second string for harmony.

See also
Giga, a type of bowed lyre
Fiðla, a bowed zither native to Iceland

Sources
Folklora.lv

References

Latvian musical instruments
Bowed box zithers